The Special Two may refer to:

 The Special Two, a nickname for Portuguese football manager André Villas-Boas
 The Special Two, a song by Australian singer-songwriter Missy Higgins